Joseph Bernard Francis Cotterill  (26 September 1905 – 8 July 1982) was a New Zealand trade unionist, sport administrator and politician of the Labour Party.

Biography

Early life and career
Cotterill was born in 1905 in Wanganui, both his parents were foundation members of the Labour Party, and entered an apprenticeship as a painter, working at the East Town Railway Workshops. Soon after he became secretary of the East Town branch of the Amalgamated Society of Railway Servants. In 1930 he married Daisy Ellen Wilks, with whom he had two sons and a daughter.

He was an active athlete and played competitive rugby, hockey, swimming and rowing as well as a surf lifesaver. He represented Wanganui at both rugby and hockey. Cotterill was an active member of the Pirate Rugby Club and the Union Boat Club. He served as a sports administrator as well for many years. He was president of the Wanganui Swimming Centre for ten years.

Political career

Cotterill joined the Labour Party in 1928 and became secretary of first the Wanganui East branch and later the Wanganui LRC. At the 1933 local-body elections he was elected to both the Wanganui City Council and Power Board, sitting on the bodies until 1938. In 1944 he was elected to the Wanganui Harbour Board, serving a three-year term. He served in the New Zealand Army during World War II and was also the first chairman of the Wanganui rehabilitation committee when it was established in 1943, serving as its head for many years.

He represented the Wanganui electorate from 1935 to 1960, when he retired for family reasons, by which time he was Wanganui's longest ever serving MP. He became Labour's junior whip in 1951 and was senior whip from 1952 until 1958. Cotterill was regarded as one of the best performing backbenchers of the First Labour Government and many thought he was more than unlucky to miss out on a place in cabinet after the formation of the Second Labour Government in 1957.

Cotterill was particularly interested in foreign affairs and spoke frequently on the topic in parliament. During the Second Labour Government he was chairman of Parliament's External Affairs Committee. In 1960 he represented the government at the opening of the third Cook Islands Legislative Assembly. He was also New Zealand's representative at two Commonwealth association conferences, in Ottawa in 1952 and Kampala in 1960. He was also the chair of a select committee on irrigation in New Zealand.

In 1953, Cotterill was awarded the Queen Elizabeth II Coronation Medal.

Later life and death
After retiring from Parliament, Cotterill became President of the New Zealand Swimming Association (1957–59) and was a national selector from 1960 until 1962. From 1954 to 1962 he was New Zealand's representative on the Olympic Swimming Association executive. He was appointed an Officer of the Order of the British Empire, for public services, in the 1974 Queen's Birthday Honours.

In 1976, Cotterill had a leg amputated and suffered from ill health frequently thereafter. He was admitted to Wanganui Hospital in June 1982 and died there on 8 July 1982. He was survived by his wife, three children, eleven grandchildren and six great-grandchildren.

Notes

References

|-

1905 births
1982 deaths
Wanganui rugby union players
New Zealand trade unionists
New Zealand sports executives and administrators
New Zealand Labour Party MPs
New Zealand military personnel of World War II
New Zealand Officers of the Order of the British Empire
Members of the New Zealand House of Representatives
New Zealand MPs for North Island electorates
20th-century New Zealand politicians
Local politicians in New Zealand
New Zealand sportsperson-politicians